Austvollen Bluff is a steep rock bluff forming the east side of Festninga Mountain in the Mühlig-Hofmann Mountains, Queen Maud Land. It was mapped by Norwegian cartographers from surveys and from air photos by the Sixth Norwegian Antarctic Expedition (1956–60) and named "Austvollen" (the "east wall").

References
 

Cliffs of Queen Maud Land
Princess Martha Coast